Saint-Joachim is a commune in the Loire-Atlantique department in western France. It is in the centre of the Brière marsh, and comprises a group of "islands" within the marsh.

See also
Communes of the Loire-Atlantique department
Parc naturel régional de Brière

References

Saintjoachim